Alireza Jalili Loghman (born February 9, 1979) is an Iranian professional football player last played for Tractor Sazi in the Iran Pro League.

Career
Salimi played for Shahrdari Tabriz before moving to Tractor Sazi in the summer of 2009.

References

External sources
 Profile at Persianleague

Living people
1979 births
Iranian footballers
Tractor S.C. players
Shahrdari Tabriz players
Persian Gulf Pro League players
Association football defenders